, son of regent Nijō Hisamoto, was a Japanese kugyō (court noble) of the Muromachi period (1336–1573). He held a regent position kampaku two times from 1518 to 1525 and from 1534 to 1536. His wife was a daughter of regent Kujō Hisatsune who gave birth to Nijō Haruyoshi. He was killed in the Tainei-ji incident of 1551.

References
 

1496 births
1551 deaths
Fujiwara clan
Korefusa